Germán Ernesto Pinillos Rioja (born 6 April 1972) is a Peruvian football manager and former footballer. He currently manages Cobresol in the Torneo Descentralizado.

Club career
Pinillos played for a number of clubs in Peru, including Sporting Cristal and Sport Boys.

International career
Pinillos made 14 appearances for the senior Peru national football team.

References

External links

1972 births
Living people
Sportspeople from Callao
Association football midfielders
Peruvian footballers
Peru international footballers
Sporting Cristal footballers
Club Universitario de Deportes footballers
Sport Boys footballers
Deportivo Municipal footballers
Peruvian Primera División players
1995 Copa América players
2000 CONCACAF Gold Cup players
Peruvian football managers
Peruvian Primera División managers